Bae Jae-jung (Korean: 배재정; Hanja: 裵在禎; born 16 February 1968) is a South Korean politician previously served as the Prime Minister Lee Nak-yeon's first chief of staff. She is the first woman to lead the Prime Minister's Secretariat (PMS) since its creation in 1960s.

Bae is one-term parliamentarian of now-ruling party, Democratic Party of Korea. During her term from 2012 to 2016, she took various roles in her party such as a member of Emergency Planning Commission in 2013, a spokesperson from 2013 to 2014 and vice-chair of Policy Committee from 2014 to 2015. Additionally, she worked as the deputy chief of staff to Moon Jae-in's first presidential campaign in 2012.

After then-parliamentarian Moon Jae-in was elected as the party leader and therefore announced that he will not seek for re-election in 2016 general election, she was chosen as a democratic candidate to replace him at the National Assembly. Unfortunately, she lost the election by less than 2,000 votes.

After serving as the chief of staff to Lee Nak-yeon, the first Prime Minister of President Moon Jae-in, she ran for the same constituency in the 2020 general election but lost again. In September 2020 she was brought back to the administration now serving as the President's secretary for political affairs.

Before entering politics, she worked as a Busan Ilbo's journalist for almost two decades from 1989 to 2007 and a ranking member of its trade union.

Bae holds a bachelor degree in English language and literature and completed master's programme in arts, culture and videography from Busan National University in 1990 and 2012 respectively.

Electoral history

References 

1968 births
Living people
Members of the National Assembly (South Korea)
21st-century South Korean women politicians
21st-century South Korean politicians
South Korean journalists
South Korean women journalists
Pusan National University alumni
People from Busan
Minjoo Party of Korea politicians
South Korean government officials
Female members of the National Assembly (South Korea)